BLH can refer to:

 Baldwin-Lima-Hamilton
 Bellshill station - see UK railway stations - B
 Blythe Airport, IATA code BLH
 Brotha Lynch Hung, American hip hop artist
 Bad Left Hook, an online boxing forum run by SB Nation